Edmond Montague Grant (born 5 March 1948) is a Guyanese-British singer, songwriter and multi-instrumentalist, known for his genre-blending sound; his music has blended elements of pop, British rock, soul, funk, reggae, electronic music, African polyrhythms, and Latin music genres such as samba, among many others. In addition to this, he also helped to pioneer the genre of "Ringbang". He was a founding member of the Equals, one of the United Kingdom's first racially-mixed pop groups who are best remembered for their million-selling UK chart-topper, the Grant-penned "Baby, Come Back".

His subsequent solo career included the 1982 song "I Don't Wanna Dance", plus the platinum 1983 single "Electric Avenue", which is his biggest international hit. He earned a Grammy Award nomination for the song. He is also well known for the anti-apartheid 1988 song, "Gimme Hope Jo'anna".

Early life
Grant was born in Plaisance, British Guiana (now Guyana), later moving to Linden. His father, Patrick, was a trumpeter who played in Nello and the Luckies. While he was at school, his parents lived and worked in the United Kingdom, sending back money for his education. In 1960, he emigrated to join his parents in London. He lived in Kentish Town and went to school at the Acland Burghley Secondary Modern at Tufnell Park, where he learned to read and write music. He became a big fan of Chuck Berry, and after seeing him play at the Finsbury Park Astoria decided on a career in music.

Career

In 1965, Grant formed the Equals, playing guitar and singing background vocals, and the band had two hit albums and a minor hit with the single "I Get So Excited" before having a number one hit in 1968 with his song "Baby Come Back". The tune also topped the UK Singles Chart in 1994, when covered by Pato Banton featuring Robin and Ali Campbell of the reggae group UB40. The Equals had five further top 40 hits in the UK up to the end of 1970. The Baby Come Back album featured a song by Grant titled "Police on My Back," which was recorded by the Clash for their 1980 album  Sandinista!. Willie Nile released his version of "Police on My Back" on his Streets of New York CD.  The Equals' song "Green Light" co-written by Grant from their 1968 album Supreme, was recorded by the Detroit Cobras, for their 2007 album, Tied & True.

In this period he also worked as a songwriter and producer for other artists, including the Pyramids (producing their debut single "Train Tour to Rainbow City") and Prince Buster, for whom he wrote "Rough Rider", and started the Torpedo record label, releasing British-made reggae singles.

On 1 January 1971, Grant suffered a heart attack and collapsed lung, leading to his departure from the Equals to concentrate on production, opening his own Coach House Studios in the grounds of his Stamford Hill home in 1972, and starting Ice Records in 1974, initially distributed by Pye Records and later by Virgin Records. He produced the Pioneers' 1976 album Feel the Rhythm, as well as early recordings by his younger brother Rudy, working under the name the Mexicano. During this time he also branched out of music, learning to tap dance, and subsequently trying his hand at acting at the behest of fellow Guyanese immigrant, actor Norman Beaton.

A self-titled solo album released in 1975 made little impact, as did the proto-soca Message Man, completed and released in 1977, on which Grant played all the instruments himself. His breakthrough as a solo artist came two years later with the album Walking on Sunshine, which spawned the UK top 20 hit "Living on the Frontline". He returned to the charts in 1980 with the top 10 hit "Do You Feel My Love", the opening track of Can't Get Enough, the 1981 album giving him his first entry in the UK Albums Chart. The album included two further hit singles, "Can't Get Enough of You" and "I Love You, Yes I Love You".

From 1982 onward, Grant was based in Barbados (where he opened his Blue Wave Studios), the same year releasing his most successful album, Killer on the Rampage, which included his two biggest solo hits, "I Don't Wanna Dance", which spent three weeks at number one in the UK as well as selling well internationally, and "Electric Avenue", which reached no. 2 in both the UK and the US. He also began producing and promoting local artists such as David Rudder, Mighty Gabby, Tamu Hibbert, and Grynner. A lean period followed; his 1984 title song for the movie Romancing the Stone was cut from the film and stalled outside the UK top 50 when released as a single, although it fared better in the US and Canada. His albums Going for Broke (1984), Born Tuff (1987), and File Under Rock (1988) failed to chart and produced no further hit singles. Grant participated in Prince Edward's charity television special The Grand Knockout Tournament (1987).

Grant returned to the charts in 1988 with the anti-apartheid single "Gimme Hope Jo'anna", a no. 7 hit in the UK. The song was banned by the South African government. In the late 1980s he pursued other business interests including music publishing and a nightclub, and built up the success of his Blue Wave studio, which was used by the Rolling Stones, Sting, Cliff Richard, and Elvis Costello.

Grant continued releasing albums in the 1990s, including Barefoot Soldier (1990), Paintings of the Soul (1992), Soca Baptism (1993), and Hearts and Diamonds (1999). In 1994 he introduced a new genre, ringbang, at the Barbados Crop Over festival. Grant said of ringbang: "What ringbang seeks to do is envelop all the rhythms that have originated from Africa so that they become one, defying all geographical boundaries." In 2000 he organised the Ringbang Celebration festival in Tobago. In 2001, a remix of "Electric Avenue" reached no. 5 in the UK and an attendant Greatest Hits album reached no. 3 in that country.

In 2004, Grant created a song for the yogurt based drink Yop, to the tune of "Gimme Hope Jo'anna".

In 2006, Grant released the album Reparation.

In 2008, he performed at Nelson Mandela's 90th birthday concert, and also played several dates in the UK, including the Glastonbury Festival.

In 2016, it was announced that Grant would receive a Lifetime Achievement Award from the government of Guyana. He was previously honoured with a postage stamp featuring his likeness and Ringbang logo by the Guyana Post Office Corporation in 2005.

In 2021, Grant sued the former U.S. president Donald Trump and his administration, over the use of his hit "Electric Avenue" in a 2020 advertisement.

Discography

Eddy Grant (1975)
Message Man (1977)
Walking on Sunshine (1979)
Love in Exile (1980)
Can't Get Enough (1981)
Killer on the Rampage (1982)
Going for Broke (1984)
Born Tuff (1986)
File Under Rock (1988)
Barefoot Soldier (1990)
Paintings of the Soul (1992)
Soca Baptism (1993)
Hearts and Diamonds (1999)
Reparation (2006)
Plaisance (2017)

Bibliography
Lloyd Bradley, Sounds Like London: 100 Years of Black Music in the Capital (contributor), Serpent's Tail, 2013,

See also
List of black Britons
Music of Guyana
Caribbean music in the United Kingdom

References

External links

 

1948 births
Living people
20th-century Guyanese male singers
British male guitarists
Guyanese emigrants to the United Kingdom
English male singer-songwriters
English reggae musicians
British reggae musicians
20th-century Black British male singers
Guyanese reggae singers
British rock singers
21st-century Guyanese male singers
British pop singers
British funk musicians
British disco musicians
Afro-Guyanese people
British Guiana people
Epic Records artists
Parlophone artists
Lead guitarists
British rock guitarists
People from Kentish Town
Recipients of the Wordsworth McAndrew Award
Reggae rock musicians
21st-century Black British male singers
People from Linden, Guyana
Second British Invasion artists
British expatriates in Barbados
Guyanese expatriates in Barbados